The martolos was an internal security force of the Ottoman Empire in the Balkans (Rumelia), mostly active between the 15th to 17th centuries. It initially constituted out of the local mostly Christian populations (Rum Millet), but over time members converted into Islam. For their military service, they were given privileged status (as askeri), in relation to the Rayah.  Their commanders were predominantly Muslim.

Tasks and privileges
In the mid-15th century, after the Ottoman conquests, the martolos were used as armed police. They usually worked locally as peace-time border patrols, fortress guards, security for mines, strategic road guards (derbend), and they were occasionally used as soldiers during war, or tax collectors. They were somewhat similar to another Ottoman organization, the Voynuks, recruited in South Slavic territories, initially tasked with the defense and security, then later used as auxiliary transportation units.

Due to their positions, they were allowed and able to hold timars. They received a daily wage, and askeri status, despite still being Christian. Their commanders were predominantly Muslim (martolos bashi). The duty was hereditary. They were exempted from the jizya and various local taxes.

History
The martolos system was adopted from the Byzantine Empire. Predominantly recruited from the Balkans, they were chosen from the land-owning Orthodox Christians, who retaining their religion, entered the askeri caste.

The martolos were used as armed police in the mid-15th century, and in the following two centuries had various security tasks (see previous section). To northwestern Bosnia and parts of Croatia (sanjak of Klis and Lika) Ottomans settled Vlach which were incorporated into hereditary Christian groups of martolos and voynuks. In Ottoman Hungary and Buda area Serbs in great numbers served as martolos, which were Christian origin members largely recruited from the Vlach and Vlach like population. It initially constituted out of the local mostly Christian populations (Rum Millet), but over time members converted into Islam. In the 17th century, following the increase of local Christian antagonism in the Balkans, the martolos that were put against the hajduks (rebels) created hostility, with some martolos joining the rebels. Due to this, the Porte had abolished the right to Balkan Christians to serve as martolos in 1692. By 1722, the Rumelian beylerbey Osman Pasha merged the organization into the Muslim pandor (local security police). A few martolos persisted in northern Macedonia until the 19th century, then replaced by the Tanzimat reforms.

Terminology
Being the original word for Christians in the Ottoman army, martolos became a general word for various Christian military groups and individuals, being used by the Ottomans for Christian spies, pathfinders, messengers, Danube boatsmen, and fortress guards, as well as for the Christian rebels fighting the akinci. During Suleiman's reign (1520–66), the term was also used for local Christian police forces, especially in brigandage-infested regions of Montenegro and Morea.

References

Sources

Military units and formations of the Ottoman Empire
15th-century establishments in the Ottoman Empire
18th-century disestablishments in the Ottoman Empire
Christians from the Ottoman Empire
Ottoman period in the Balkans
Auxiliary military units
Auxiliary police units
Historical law enforcement occupations